Bram Schmitz (born 23 April 1977) is a retired Dutch professional road cyclist.

Major results

1999
 1st Stage 3 OZ Wielerweekend
 5th Rund um den Henninger Turm U23
 8th Overall Olympia's Tour
2000
 1st Challenge de Hesbaye
 2nd Brussel-Opwijk
2001
 8th Rund um den Flughafen Köln–Bonn
2002
 2nd Overall Ster ZLM Toer
1st Stage 4 (ITT)
 4th Overall Four Days of Dunkirk
 4th Ronde van Midden-Zeeland
 4th Schaal Sels
 6th GP de Villers-Cotterêts
 7th Hel van het Mergelland
 10th Veenendaal–Veenendaal
2003
 1st Overall Tour of Rhodes
 1st  Mountains classification, Deutschland Tour
 1st  Mountains classification, Tour de Luxembourg
 1st Mountains classification, Grote Prijs Erik Breukink
 4th Veenendaal–Veenendaal
 4th Grand Prix S.A.T.S.
 5th Overall Ster Elektrotoer
 9th Dwars door Gendringen
2005
 1st Stage 5 Tour de Luxembourg
 1st Mountains classification, Vuelta a Aragón
2007
 1st Stages 1 & 3 Cinturón a Mallorca
 7th Overall Ster Elektrotoer
2008
 1st De Vlaamse Pijl
 1st Rund um Düren
 2nd Overall Tour de Bretagne Cycliste
 2nd Omloop der Kempen
 5th Omloop van het Waasland
 9th Overall Tour de Normandie
 10th Trofeo Cala Millor-Cala Bona
 10th Hel van het Mergelland
2009
 1st  Overall Tour de Normandie
 1st Ster van Zwolle
 2nd De Vlaamse Pijl
 7th Dutch Food Valley Classic
2010
 2nd Profronde van Fryslan
 4th Overall Ster Elektrotoer
 4th Omloop der Kempen
 7th Rund um Düren
 9th GP Stad Zottegem
 10th Overall Olympia's Tour
2011
 6th Overall Delta Tour Zeeland

References

External links

1977 births
Living people
Dutch male cyclists
People from Oude IJsselstreek
Cyclists from Gelderland
21st-century Dutch people